The 2012 AMA Pro American Superbike Championship was the 37th running of the AMA Superbike Championship. The championship covered 11 rounds beginning at Daytona International Speedway on March 17 and concluding at NOLA Motorsports Park on October 7. The champion was Josh Hayes riding a Yamaha.

Calendar

  = World Superbike Weekend
  = MotoGP weekend

External links
The official website of the AMA Pro Racing Championship 

AMA Superbike Championship seasons
AMA Pro American Superbike
AMA Pro American Superbike